Renewable energy is generally defined as energy that comes from resources which are naturally replenished on a human timescale, such as sunlight, wind, rain, tides, waves, and geothermal heat. Renewable energy replaces conventional fuels in four distinct areas: electricity generation, air and water heating/cooling, motor fuels, and rural (off-grid) energy services. Based on REN21's 2014 report, renewables contributed 19 percent to our global energy consumption and 22 percent to our electricity generation in 2012 and 2013, respectively.

These are lists about renewable energy:

 Index of solar energy articles
 List of books about renewable energy
 List of concentrating solar thermal power companies
 List of countries by electricity production from renewable sources
 List of energy storage projects
 Lists of environmental topics
 List of geothermal power stations
 List of hydroelectric power stations
 List of largest hydroelectric power stations
 List of offshore wind farms
 Lists of offshore wind farms by country
 Lists of offshore wind farms by water area
 List of onshore wind farms
 List of onshore wind farms in the United Kingdom
 List of people associated with renewable energy
 List of photovoltaics companies
 List of photovoltaic power stations
 List of pioneering solar buildings
 List of renewable energy organizations
 List of renewable energy topics by country
 List of rooftop photovoltaic installations
 List of solar car teams
 List of solar powered products
 List of solar thermal power stations
 List of U.S. states by electricity production from renewable sources
 Lists of wind farms by country
 List of wind farms in Australia
 List of wind farms in Canada
 List of wind farms in Iran
 List of wind farms in Romania
 List of wind farms in Sweden
 List of wind farms in the United States
 List of wind turbine manufacturers

See also
Outline of solar energy
Outline of wind energy

References